Elstone D Marak is an Indian politician from Meghalaya. He is a member of the Nationalist Congress Party.

In 2003, he was elected from East Garo Hills district's Kharkutta assembly constituency of Meghalaya.

References

Living people
Nationalist Congress Party politicians from Meghalaya
People from East Garo Hills district
Meghalaya MLAs 2003–2008
Year of birth missing (living people)
Garo people